Broadway District is a national historic district located at Hannibal, Marion County, Missouri.   The district encompasses 28 contributing buildings in the central business district of Hannibal. It developed between about 1866 and 1934, and includes representative examples of Italianate, Classical Revival, and Art Deco architecture. Notable buildings include the Lakenan Building (c. 1866), Kresge Building (1931), Second Farmers and Merchants Bank (c. 1910), Sproul-Cash Store (1901), Hannibal Trust Company (1909-1910), Hickman Block (c. 1865), and Robinson Brothers (c. 1894).

It was listed on the National Register of Historic Places in 1986.

References

Historic districts on the National Register of Historic Places in Missouri
Italianate architecture in Missouri
Neoclassical architecture in Missouri
Art Deco architecture in Missouri]
Buildings and structures in Marion County, Missouri
National Register of Historic Places in Marion County, Missouri